Chen Tien-miao (16 April 1928 – 7 March 2018) was a Taiwanese politician.

Political career
Chen Chi-chin's brother Chen Chi-chuan served as mayor of Kaohsiung from 1960 to 1968. Chen Tien-mao himself was first elected to the Kaohsiung City Council in 1958, and served as council speaker for four terms.

Business career
Chen and his family owned the Hsinkao Petroleum Company and held management positions at Ta Chong Bank.

Death
Chen Tien-mao died in Kaohsiung, on 7 March 2018, aged 89.

References

2018 deaths
1928 births
Speakers of the Kaohsiung City Council
20th-century Taiwanese politicians
Kuomintang politicians in Taiwan
Chen family of Kaohsiung
21st-century Taiwanese politicians